Madame Nguyễn Thị Định (15 March 1920 – 26 August 1992) was the first female general of the Vietnam People's Army during the Vietnam War and the first female Vice President of Vietnam. Her role in the war was as National Liberation Front deputy commander, and was described as "the most important Southern woman revolutionary in the war". Furthermore, she was commander of an all-female force known as the Long-Haired Army, which engaged in espionage and combat against ARVN and US Forces.

Biography

Nguyễn Thị Định was born from a peasant family in Bến Tre Province, and fought with the Viet Minh forces against the French. She was arrested and incarcerated by the French colonial authority between 1940–43, and helped lead an insurrection in Bến Tre in 1945, and again in 1960 (against the government of Ngô Đình Diệm). In that period, she lost her first husband while incarcerated by French authorities. She was a founding member of the National Liberation Front (NLF). In 1965 she was elected chairwoman of the South Vietnam Women's Liberation Association, who were given the name the "long-haired warriors" by Ho Chi Minh. A portion of membership in the National Liberation Front continued to be women, and many were drawn to the promise of changes in the role of women in society.

After the Vietnam War and the reunification of Vietnam, Madame Định served on the Central Committee of the Vietnamese Communist Party and also became the first female major general to serve in the Vietnam People's Army. She was also one of the Deputy Chairmen of the Council of State from 1987 until her death. Together with Madame Nguyễn Thị Bình, she is one of the two most prominent female Vietnamese communist leaders. She was awarded the Lenin Peace Prize for 1967. In 1995, she was posthumously awarded the title Hero of the People's Armed Forces. 

Her memoirs were translated and published by Cornell University Press in 1976. Nguyen Thi Dinh was interviewed by Stanley Karnow for Vietnam: A Television History documentary. She contributed the piece "The braided army" to the 1984 anthology Sisterhood Is Global: The International Women's Movement Anthology, edited by Robin Morgan.

References

1920 births
1992 deaths
Vice presidents of Vietnam
Lenin Peace Prize recipients
Members of the 4th Central Committee of the Communist Party of Vietnam
Members of the 5th Central Committee of the Communist Party of Vietnam
Members of the 6th Central Committee of the Communist Party of Vietnam
People from Bến Tre Province
Place of death missing
Women in the Vietnam War
Vietnamese people of the Vietnam War
20th-century Vietnamese women politicians
20th-century Vietnamese politicians
Women vice presidents
Women government ministers of Vietnam